The South African Railways Class 6D  of 1898 was a steam locomotive from the pre-Union era in the Cape of Good Hope.

In 1898, a fourth batch of 33 6th Class  steam locomotives were placed in service by the Cape Government Railways. In 1912, when these locomotives were assimilated into the South African Railways, they were renumbered and designated Class 6D.

Manufacturer
The original 6th Class  passenger steam locomotive was designed at the Salt River works of the Cape Government Railways (CGR) in 1893, at the same time as the 7th Class and both according to the specifications of Michael Stephens, at the time Chief Locomotive Superintendent of the CGR, and under the supervision of H.M. Beatty, at the time Locomotive Superintendent of the Western System.

The 33 locomotives in this fourth group of the CGR 6th Class were built in 1898 by Neilson, Reid and Company. Of these engines, 26 went to the CGR's Western System, numbered in the range from 234 to 259, three to the Midland System, numbered 585, 586 and 594, and four to the Eastern System, numbered in the range from 665 to 668.

These locomotives represented a further advance on earlier 6th Class locomotives, with a greater heating surface and a larger firegrate area. They did, however, revert to the same Type YC six-wheeled tenders which were earlier used with the second group of 6th Class locomotives, later the Class 6A.

Class 6 sub-classes
When the Union of South Africa was established on 31 May 1910, the three Colonial government railways (CGR, Natal Government Railways and Central South African Railways) were united under a single administration to control and administer the railways, ports and harbours of the Union. Although the South African Railways and Harbours came into existence in 1910, the actual classification and renumbering of all the rolling stock of the three constituent railways were only implemented with effect from 1 January 1912.

When these locomotives were assimilated into the South African Railways (SAR) in 1912, they were renumbered in the range from 565 to 597 and designated Class 6D. The rest of the CGR's 6th Class locomotives, together with the Class 6-L1 to 6L3 locomotives which had been inherited by the Central South African Railways from the Oranje-Vrijstaat Gouwerment-Spoorwegen via the Imperial Military Railways, were grouped into thirteen more sub-classes by the SAR. The  locomotives became SAR Classes 6, 6A to 6C, 6E to 6H and 6J to 6L, the  locomotives became Class 6Y and the  locomotives became Class 6Z.

Service

South Africa
The Class 6 series of locomotives were introduced primarily as passenger locomotives, but when the class became displaced by larger and more powerful locomotive classes, it literally became a Jack-of-all-trades which proved itself as one of the most useful and successful locomotive classes ever to be designed at the Salt River shops. It went on to see service in all parts of the country, except Natal, and was used on all types of traffic.

After the Simon's Town line in Cape Town was electrified in 1928, Class 6D engines that used to haul commuters on this line became dock shunting engines in Table Bay Harbour. This continued until they were gradually replaced by new Class S2 0-8-0 shunting engines from 1952.

Sudan
During the Second World War, sixteen locomotives of the Classes 6 to 6D were transferred to the Middle East to assist with the war effort during the North African Campaign. The two Class 6D locomotives in this group were numbers 572 and 587. They did not return to South Africa after the war and were sold to the Sudan Railways Corporation in 1942. Sudan Railways renumbered them M714 and M715, in the same order as their former SAR engine numbers.

Renumbering
The Class 6D works numbers, system allocation and renumbering are listed in the table.

Preservation
Only one of these locomotives survives. No. 579 is plinthed at King William's Town Station Forecourt.

References

1350
4-6-0 locomotives
2′C n2 locomotives
1350
Steam locomotives of Sudan
Neilson Reid locomotives
Cape gauge railway locomotives
Railway locomotives introduced in 1898
1898 in South Africa
Passenger locomotives
Scrapped locomotives